Northern Exposure is an American television drama series created by Joshua Brand and John Falsey and produced by Cine-Nevada Productions and Universal Television. The show originally aired in the United States on CBS between July 12, 1990 and July 26, 1995, with 110 episodes split five seasons. The series, which starred Rob Morrow, Barry Corbin, Janine Turner, John Cullum, Darren E. Burrows, John Corbett, Cynthia Geary, Elaine Miles, Peg Phillips, Paul Provenza and Teri Polo, follows a New York City physician who sets up his practice in an eccentric small town.

Northern Exposure garnered critical praise and amassed 123 nominations for various industry awards. This includes 39 Emmy awards (with 7 wins), 10 Golden Globe awards (with 2 wins), 6 TCA awards (with one win), 19 Q awards (with two wins), 4 Directors Guild of America awards (one win) and 3 Writers Guild of America awards, as well as winning 2 consecutive Peabody Awards.

Several Northern Exposure cast members received awards and nominations for their individual work. Janine Turner, who portrayed lead character Maggie O'Donnell, received the most award nominations (12) while Valerie Mahaffey is the only actor on the series to win a Primetime Emmy Award.

Awards and nominations

ACE Eddie Awards
Presented since 1962, the Eddie Award is an annual accolade that was created by American Cinema Editors to award outstanding achievements in editing in television and film. Northern Exposure won an award, out of three nominations, for Best Edited One-Hour Series for Television.

American Television Awards
The American Television Awards was a television sweeps special that aired on ABC in 1993 as a remedy to 44th Primetime Emmy Awards, giving awards similar to those presented by Academy of Television Arts & Sciences. Northern Exposure received seven nominations.

Artios Awards
Presented by the Casting Society of America, the Artios Award is an annual accolades honoring outstanding achievements in casting. Northern Exposure won two awards out of five nominations.

BMI Film & TV Awards
Broadcast Music, Inc. (BMI) is one of three United States performing rights organizations, along with ASCAP and SESAC. It collects license fees on behalf of songwriters, composers, and music publishers and distributes them as royalties to those members whose works have been performed. Northern Exposure received three awards from BMI.

Directors Guild of America Awards
The Directors Guild of America Award is an annual accolade presented by the Directors Guild of America (DGA) which awards outstanding achievements in the field of directing. Northern Exposure received five nominations during its tenure, winning once for Outstanding Directorial Achievement in a Drama Series.

Emmy Awards
Presented by the Academy of Television Arts & Sciences since 1949, the Primetime Emmy Award is an annual accolade that honors outstanding achievements in various aspects of television such as acting, directing and writing. The cast and crew of Northern Exposure received 39 nominations, winning seven awards.

Primetime Emmy Awards

Creative Arts Emmy Awards

Golden Globe Awards

The Golden Globe Award is an annual accolade presented by the Hollywood Foreign Press Association (HFPA) which honors the best performances in television and film. Northern Exposure received ten nominations, winning two awards for Best Television Series – Drama.

Peabody Awards
Awarded since 1940, the Peabody Award, named after American banker and philanthropist George Peabody, is an annual award the recognizes excellence in storytelling across mediums including television, radio, television networks, and online videos. Northern Exposure won two consecutive awards, a rarity for television series, with the second award for the episode "Cicely".

Q Awards

The Q Award, presented by the Viewers for Quality Television since 1986, recognizes critically acclaimed programs and performers for their outstanding achievements in television. During its tenure, Northern Exposure won 2 awards out of 19 nominations.

Television Critics Association Awards
Awarded by the Television Critics Association since 1985, the Television Critics Association Award (TCA Award) is an annual accolade that recognizes outstanding achievements in television programming and acting performances. Northern Exposure received six nominations, winning once for Program of the Year.

Other Awards

References

External links
 List of Primetime Emmy Awards received by Northern Exposure
 List of awards and nominations received by Northern Exposure at the Internet Movie Database

Northern Exposure